Giuseppe Minardi (18 March 1928 – 21 January 2019) was an Italian racing cyclist. He won the 1952 edition of the Giro di Lombardia.

Major results

1949
 1st Trofeo Matteotti
1950
 4th Giro della Romagna
 8th Giro di Lombardia
 9th Giro dell'Emilia
1951
 1st Trofeo Baracchi (shared with Fiorenzo Magni)
 1st Stage 10 Giro d'Italia
 2nd Giro di Lombardia
 2nd Giro di Toscana
 5th Tre Valli Varesine
 8th Road race, UCI Road World Championships
 10th Giro dell'Emilia
1952 
 1st Giro di Lombardia
 1st Tre Valli Varesine
 1st Giro di Campania
 1st Stage 15 Giro d'Italia
 2nd Road race, National Road Championships
 2nd Milan–San Remo
 2nd Giro dell'Emilia
 2nd Trofeo Baracchi
 2nd Giro dell'Appennino
 3rd Giro di Romagna
 3rd Giro della Provincia di reggio Calabria
1953
 1st Stage 6 Giro d'Italia
 1st Stage 2a Roma–Napoli–Roma
 2nd Milan–San Remo
 7th Giro del Veneto
 10th Giro del Lazio
1954 
 1st Giro della Romagna
 1st Giro della Provincia di reggio Calabria
 1st Stage 2 Giro d'Italia
 3rd Road race, National Road Championships
 3rd Tre Valli Varesine
 6th Giro dell'Emilia
 7th Giro del Lazio
1955
 1st Giro del Piemonte
 1st Trofeo Matteotti
 1st Stage 14 Giro d'Italia
 2nd Road race, National Road Championships
 3rd Tre Valli Varesine
 5th Giro della Romagna
 8th Overall Roma–Napoli–Roma
1956 
 1st Giro della Provincia di reggio Calabria
 Giro d'Italia
 1st Stages 2b (TTT) & 5a 
 2nd Giro della Romagna
 3rd Tre Valli Varesine
 7th Giro di Toscana

References

External links
 

1928 births
2019 deaths
Italian male cyclists
Cyclists from Emilia-Romagna